Type 865 reconnaissance boat is a type of reconnaissance boat developed by China for the People's Liberation Army Navy (PLAN) to deliver reconnaissance and special forces.

References

Gunboat classes
Gunboats of the People's Liberation Army Navy